Torrisdale is a remote hamlet on the western shore of Torrisdale Bay in Sutherland, Highland, on the north coast of Scotland.

On 5 May 1942, the American Liberty ship SS John Randolph struck a mine en route from northern Russia to Iceland. The forepart was salved but broke tow on 1 September 1952 and was wrecked at Torrisdale Bay on 5 September, where the wreckage remains on the beach and is uncovered at low tide.

References

Populated places in Sutherland